"And When the Sky Was Opened" is episode eleven of the American television anthology series The Twilight Zone. It originally aired on December 11, 1959. It is an adaptation of the 1953  Richard Matheson short story "Disappearing Act."

Opening narration

The narration continues after Forbes' introduction.

Plot
United States Air Force Colonel Clegg Forbes arrives at a military hospital to visit his friend and co-pilot Major William Gart. The two had recently piloted an experimental spaceplane, the X-20. During their voyage the craft disappeared from radar screens for a full day before reappearing and crash landing in the desert, leaving Gart with a broken leg. Forbes is agitated and asks Gart if he remembers how many people were on the mission. Gart confirms that only he and Forbes piloted the plane, but Forbes insists that a third man – Colonel Ed Harrington, his best friend for 15 years – accompanied them.

In a flashback, Harrington and Forbes are discharged from the hospital after passing their physical exams and visit a bar downtown. While there, Harrington is suddenly overcome by a feeling that he no longer "belongs" in the world.  Disturbed, he phones his parents, who tell him they have no son named Ed and believe the person calling them is a prankster. Harrington then mysteriously vanishes from the phone booth and no one but Forbes remembers his existence.  Increasingly desperate, Forbes fruitlessly searches for any trace of his friend.

Back in the present, Forbes finishes recounting the story to Gart and is dismayed by his friend's claim that he doesn't know anyone named Harrington. Forbes then glances at a mirror and discovers he casts no reflection, causing him to flee the room in terror. Gart tries to hobble after him only to find that Forbes has disappeared. Calling the duty nurse to ask if she saw where Forbes went, Gart is stunned by the nurse's claim that nobody named Forbes has been in the building and that Gart was the only man who was in the hospital room. Horrified, Gart also disappears.

An officer enters the building and asks the duty nurse if there are any unused rooms available to accommodate new patients. The nurse takes him to the now completely empty room which hosted the three astronauts, telling him that it has been unoccupied. The hangar which previously housed the X-20 is then shown, with the sheet that covered the craft lying on the ground. There is no trace of the plane.

Closing narration

Episode notes
This episode is loosely based on the short story "Disappearing Act" by Richard Matheson. The story was first published in The Magazine of Fantasy and Science Fiction (March 1953).

Rod Taylor and director Douglas Heyes later worked together on the TV series Bearcats!

Toward the end of the episode, Rod Taylor's character, Clegg Forbes, panics when he appears to cast no reflection when looking at a mirror in the hospital room. Due to what appears to be a production error in crafting this illusion, Taylor's right elbow is, in fact, visible in the mirror throughout the duration of this shot, with three fingers of Taylor's right hand appearing in the mirror as well when Taylor raises his hands in horror.

See also
 "Remember Me", an episode of Star Trek: The Next Generation, in which ship's doctor Beverly Crusher undergoes a comparable experience.
 "Revisions", a Stargate SG-1 episode with a similar plot.
 "Games People Play", a Eureka episode with a similar plot.

References

Bibliography
DeVoe, Bill (2008). Trivia from The Twilight Zone. Albany, GA: Bear Manor Media. .
Grams, Martin (2008). The Twilight Zone: Unlocking the Door to a Television Classic. Churchville, MD: OTR Publishing. .

External links
 
 And When The Sky Was Opened | John's Twilight Zone Page

1959 American television episodes
Adaptations of works by Richard Matheson
Television shows based on short fiction
The Twilight Zone (1959 TV series season 1) episodes
Films scored by Leonard Rosenman
Television episodes about multiple time paths
Works about astronauts
Films directed by Douglas Heyes